George "Royal George" Williamson, Esq., was a prominent Caswell County Sheriff from 1815 to 1832, one of the justices of the Court of Pleas and Quarter Sessions, Chairman of the Court, he served as a member of the Council of State from 1834 to 1836, as a member of the North Carolina State Senate, and as a charter member of the Bank of Yanceyville in 1852. “Royal George” was a state senator who represented North Carolina's 37th District (now 30th District) from November 18, 1850 to January 29, 1851. He owned the Melrose/Williamson House, which is a historic plantation house, which was added to the National Register of Historic Places in 1985.

References 

 
 
 
 
 

North Carolina state senators
1788 births
1856 deaths
People from Caswell County, North Carolina